Chlorine bleaching may refer to chlorine-based bleaching in 
 the pulp and paper industry: Chlorine and hypochlorite bleaching of wood pulp
 household cleaning: Chlorine-based bleaches